The 2020 COSAFA U-20 Cup was the 27th edition of the COSAFA U-20 Challenge Cup, an international youth football tournament open to national associations of the COSAFA region. It took place between 3 December and 13 December in Nelson Mandela Bay, South Africa.
Initially planned to be hosted by Mauritius, the competition was later shifted to South Africa after Mauritius withdrew as hosts due to the COVID-19 regulations. The matches were played at Port Elizabeth (Wolfson Stadium and Gelvandale Stadium). 

The tournament was also the first qualifying round for the U-20 World Cup in Indonesia in 2021 as the finalists were qualified for the 2021 Africa U-20 Cup of Nations, played in Mauritania where the semi-finalists will see themselves qualify for the World Cup.

Participants

 (Host)
 (Defending champions)

Match officials

Referees
 (Ms) Akhona Makalima (South Africa)  
 Abongile Tom (South Africa)
 Mathews M. Hamalila (Zambia)
 (Ms) Letticia Viana (Eswatini) 
 Keabetswe Dintwa (Botswana)
 Lebalang Martin Mokete  (Lesotho)
 Ishmael Chizinga (Malawi)

Reserve Referees
 (Ms) Patience Mumba (Zambia)
 (Ms) Vistoria Nuusiku Shangula (Namibia)    

Assistant Referees
  Venestancio Cossa (Mozambique)
 Tilolo Gaselame Molefe (Botswana)
 Edgar Rumeck (Zimbabwe)
 (Ms) Claris Simango (Zimbabwe)
 (Ms) Diana Chikotesha (Zambia)
 Shaun Siza Dlangamandla (Lesotho) 
 Shaun Olive (South Africa)
 Clemence Kanduku (Malawi)
 Petros Mzi Mbingo (Eswatini)

Draw
The draw was made in Nelson Mandela Bay on the 2nd of November. Last year's top nations were seeded into one group each and the rest of the teams were placed in 2 pots depending on last year's performance. From the first pot, teams were drawn and slotted consecutively into groups A, B, and C. The last team from pot 1 was then placed among the pot 2 teams to make them 5. Now the teams from the second pot were drawn and slotted consecutively into groups A, B, and C resulting that group C ended up with one less team.

Note: Within brackets 2019 year's performance.

Group stage
The group stage will be played in 3 groups as a round-robin, where the group winners and the best runner up will advance to the semi-finals.

Group A

Group B

Group C

Knockout stage

Semi-finals
Winners qualified for 2021 Africa U-20 Cup of Nations.

Third-place match

Final

Champions

Qualification for CAF U20 Cup of Nations
The two finalists of the tournament qualified for the 2021 Africa U-20 Cup of Nations. 

Qualified nations:

References

2020 in African football
COSAFA U-20 Challenge Cup
2020 in South African sport
International association football competitions hosted by South Africa
December 2020 sports events in South Africa